Robert Mercer Taliaferro Hunter (April 21, 1809 – July 18, 1887) was an American lawyer, politician and planter. He was a U.S. representative (1837–1843, 1845–1847), speaker of the House (1839–1841), and U.S. senator (1847–1861). During the American Civil War, Hunter became the Confederate States Secretary of State (1861–1862) and then a Confederate senator (1862–1865) and critic of President Jefferson Davis. After the war, Hunter failed to win re-election to the U.S. Senate, but did serve as the treasurer of Virginia (1874–1880) before retiring to his farm. After fellow Democrat Grover Cleveland was elected President of the United States in 1884, Hunter became the customs collector for the port of Tappahannock until his death.

Early life and education
Born at the "Mount Pleasant" plantation near Loretto, Essex County, Virginia, to James Hunter (1774-1826) and his wife Maria (Garnett) Hunter (1777-1811), R.M.T. Hunter was descended from the First Families of Virginia. His mother's father, Henry Garnett was one of the county's largest landowners, her brother James M. Garnett was the U.S. Congressman representing the area (and her other brother Robert S. Garnett would be within a decade). However, Maria Hunter died shortly after giving birth to William Garnett Hunter (1811-1829), when Robert M. T. Hunter was two years old, and shortly after one of his slightly elder brothers, also William Hunter, died at age 5. Educated first by private tutors, R. M. T. Hunter entered the University of Virginia when he was 17, shortly after his father's death, and became one of its first graduates.  While a student, Hunter became a member of the Jefferson Literary and Debating Society, then studied law at the Winchester Law School.

Planter
Several generations of Hunter's family owned a considerable number of slaves, most used to farm their plantations. In 1830, R.M.T. Hunter owned 72 slaves (44 males and 26 females), and his household consisted of two white males (presumably him and an overseer). A decade later, following his marriage, R. M. T. Hunter's household included himself, two young white males (presumably one his eldest son) and five white females, as well as 83 slaves. In 1850, R. M. T. Hunter of Essex County, Virginia, owned at least 100 slaves. In the 1860 U.S. Federal census for Essex County, Virginia, U.S. Senator Hunter owned real estate worth $80,890 and personal property (including slaves) worth $92,800. The federal lists of slaves owned by R. M. T. Hunter nearly fill the majority of two pages (more than 120 persons).

Political career
In 1830, Hunter was admitted to the Virginia bar. In 1834, he was elected to represent Essex County in the Virginia House of Delegates, succeeding Richard Baylor. R. M. T. Hunter won re-election in 1834 and 1836, but resigned upon winning election to the U.S. Congress as discussed next.
 
In 1836, Hunter was elected U.S. Representative as a States Rights Whig. He was re-elected in 1838, and became Speaker of the United States House of Representatives – the youngest person ever to hold that office. He was re-elected again in 1840,  but was not chosen Speaker. In 1842 he was defeated for re-election, but returned in 1844. Hunter favored annexing Texas and compromise on the Oregon question (opposing the Wilmot Proviso), and led efforts to retrocede the City of Alexandria back to Virginia (removing it from the District of Columbia). After losing the 1842 election, Hunter changed parties, becoming a Democrat. In 1845, he again took the oath of office as an elected Congressman, and supported the Tariff of 1846.

In 1846, the Virginia General Assembly elected Hunter U.S. Senator. He assumed office in 1847 and won re-election in 1852 and 1858. Hunter continued to support slavery and its extension: favoring extending the Missouri Compromise line to the Pacific Ocean, opposing abolishing the slave trade in the District of Columbia as well as any interference with its operation in any state or territory, and supported the Fugitive Slave Act of 1850. Senator Hunter delivered an address in Richmond supporting states’ rights in 1852, and in the 1857-58 Congressional session advocated admitting Kansas under the pro-slavery Lecompton constitution.

In the Senate, Hunter became chairman of the Committee on Finance in 1850. He is credited with bringing about a reduction of the quantity of silver in small silver denominations, helping push forward Senate Bill No. 271 which would eventually become the Coinage Act of 1853. Hunter also drafted and sponsored the Tariff of 1857 (which lowered duties) and creation of the bonded-warehouse system, although federal revenues were thereby reduced. He also advocated civil service reform.

In January 1860, Hunter delivered a speech in favor of slavery and the right of slaveholders to carry their slaves into the territories. At the first session of the 1860 Democratic National Convention in Charleston, South Carolina, Hunter was a contender for the presidential nomination, but received little support except from the Virginia delegation. On the first eight ballots, he was a very distant second to the leader, Stephen A. Douglas, and was third on the remaining 49 ballots. When the convention reconvened in Baltimore, most Southerners withdrew, including Hunter, and Douglas won the party's nomination.

Hunter did not regard Lincoln's election as being of itself sufficient cause for secession. On January 11, 1861, he proposed an elaborate but impracticable scheme to adjust differences between the North and the South. When this and several other similar efforts failed, Hunter quietly urged his own state to pass the ordinance of secession in April 1861. He was expelled from the Senate for supporting secession. One scheme proposed him as president of the new Confederate government, with fellow former U.S. Senator Jefferson Davis as commander of the Confederate States Army. Voters in parts of Virginia which had not seceded elected Unionist John S. Carlile to fill the rest of Hunter's term.

American Civil War

In July 1861, Confederate President Jefferson Davis appointed Hunter the Confederate States Secretary of State. He resigned on February 18, 1862, after his election as a Confederate Senator. Hunter served in the Confederate Senate in Richmond, Virginia, until the war's end, and was at times  President pro tem. His portrait appeared on the Confederate $10 bill.

As a Confederate Senator, Hunter became an often caustic critic of Confederate President Davis. Despite this friction, Davis appointed Hunter as one of three commissioners sent to attempt peace negotiations in February 1865. Hunter met with President Abraham Lincoln and Secretary of State William H. Seward at the Hampton Roads Conference. However, after Lincoln refused to acknowledge the Confederacy's independence, Senator Hunter chaired a war meeting in Richmond where Confederates vowed they would never lay down their arms before achieving independence. Following Lee's surrender, President Lincoln summoned Hunter to confer regarding Virginia's restoration to the Union.

Many of Hunter's Garnett relatives became Confederate military officers, and his cousin Judge Muscoe Garnett (1808-1880) commanded the Home Guard in Essex County. Hunter's first cousins (through his mother) were career U.S. Army officers who became Confederate generals Robert S. Garnett and Richard B. Garnett, both of whom died in the conflict. His son James D. Hunter enlisted as a private in Company F, 9th Virginia Cavalry, which was organized in December 1861 with Lt. Garnett among its officers, and which was initially assigned to protect the Rappahannock River as well as the Rappahannock river port cities of Falmouth and Fredericksburg. James D. Hunter served only months before being furloughed on account of sickness in July 1862, but did participate in raids under Gen. J.E.B. Stuart and Capt. William Latane (who became a Confederate martyr as the only casualty of Stuart's vaunted ride around Union troops) and in General Lee's Seven Day offensive which ended the Union Peninsular Campaign. While his eldest son R.M.T. Hunter Jr. died early in the war of disease, his second son, Robert D. Hunter, served as a staff officer in the Army of Northern Virginia and as an engineer.

When some suggested late in the war that their slaves could be armed and serve in the Confederate Army to win their freedom, Senator R.M.T. Hunter vehemently opposed the proposal with a long speech against it, but after the Virginia legislature passed a resolution to the contrary, voted as instructed but with an emphatic protest.

Later years

In 1867, President Andrew Johnson pardoned Hunter for his activities supporting the Confederate States. He unsuccessfully ran to become U.S. Senator again in 1874, to succeed Unionist Republican John F. Lewis. However, Confederate veteran Robert E. Withers of the Conservative Party won. After that loss, Hunter accepted an appointment as the Treasurer of Virginia, serving from 1874 to 1880, when he returned to his farm. Hunter also published Origin of the Late War, about the causes of the Civil War. From 1885 until his death, he was customs collector of the Port of Tappahannock, Virginia, near his home.

He died near Lloyds, Virginia, in 1887, and was buried at the Garnett family burial ground in Loretto in Essex County.

Personal life
He married Mary Evelina Dandridge (1817–1893) on October 4, 1836, in Jefferson County (then in Virginia, but which became West Virginia during the American Civil War). They had sons Robert Mercer Taliaferro Hunter Jr. (1839-1861), James Dandridge Hunter (1844-1892), Philip Stephen Hunter (1848–1919) and Muscoe Russell Garnett Hunter (1850-1865). Their daughters (educated and unmarried) were Martha Taliaferro Hunter (1841-1909), Sarah Stephena Hunter (1846-1865), Annie Buchanan Hunter (1852-1853) and Mary Evelina Hunter 1854-1881). In 1860 and later censuses, R. M. T. Hunter's unmarried sisters Martha Fenton Hunter (1800-1866) and Jane Swann Hunter (1804-1880) and half-sister Sara (Sully) Hunter (1822-1874) also lived on the family plantation.

Legacy

In 1942, a United States Liberty ship named the SS Robert M. T. Hunter was launched. She was scrapped in 1971.

As a former Speaker of the House, his portrait had been on display in the US Capitol. The portrait was removed from public display in the Speaker's Lobby outside the House Chamber after an order issued by the Speaker of the House, Nancy Pelosi, on June 18, 2020.

In popular culture
Hunter appeared in the 2012 film Lincoln, which included the Hampton Roads Conference. He was portrayed by Mike Shiflett.

See also
List of United States senators expelled or censured

Notes

References

Further reading

External links

Retrocession of Alexandria – A speech by R. M. T. Hunter before the U.S. House of Representatives, May 8, 1846

1809 births
1887 deaths
19th-century American lawyers
19th-century American politicians
American proslavery activists
Candidates in the 1860 United States presidential election
Executive members of the Cabinet of the Confederate States of America
Confederate States of America senators
Democratic Party members of the United States House of Representatives from Virginia
Democratic Party United States senators from Virginia
Deputies and delegates to the Provisional Congress of the Confederate States
Expelled United States senators
Garnett family of Virginia
Members of the Virginia House of Delegates
People from Essex County, Virginia
People of Virginia in the American Civil War
Speakers of the United States House of Representatives
State treasurers of Virginia
University of Virginia alumni
Virginia lawyers
Virginia state senators
Virginia Whigs
Whig Party members of the United States House of Representatives
Winchester Law School alumni
Southern Historical Society